Granath is a Swedish surname.

Geographical distribution
As of 2014, 78.4% of all known bearers of the surname Granath were residents of Sweden (frequency 1:3,974), 14.6% of the United States (1:783,625), 2.3% of Finland (1:76,344) and 1.0% of Norway (1:165,882).

In Sweden, the frequency of the surname was higher than national average (1:3,974) in the following counties:
 1. Östergötland County (1:2,135)
 2. Jönköping County (1:2,890)
 3. Örebro County (1:3,205)
 4. Dalarna County (1:3,254)
 5. Stockholm County (1:3,299)
 6. Västmanland County (1:3,325)
 7. Värmland County (1:3,383)
 8. Gävleborg County (1:3,415)
 9. Södermanland County (1:3,674)
 10. Västra Götaland County (1:3,734)

In Finland, the frequency of the surname was higher than national average (1:76,344) in the following regions:
 1. Lapland (1:13,329)
 2. Pirkanmaa (1:30,910)
 3. Kymenlaakso (1:34,180)
 4. Satakunta (1:35,575)
 5. Uusimaa (1:64,007)

People
Björn Granath (born 1946), Swedish actor
Bo Granath, Swedish Grand Prix motorcycle road racer 
Einar Granath (1936–1993), Swedish ice hockey player
Elias Granath (born 1985), Swedish ice hockey defenceman 
Oloph Granath (born 1951), Swedish speed skater 
Tiffany Granath, American actress and satellite radio personality

References

Swedish-language surnames